Meaulne-Vitray is a commune in the department of Allier, central France. The municipality was established on 1 January 2017 by merger of the former communes of Meaulne (the seat) and Vitray.

History 

Politics and administration

Administrative and electoral attachments 
Meaulne-Vitray is situated in the Montluçon arrondissement in the department of Allier. Within the department, the commune is attached to the Canton of Bourbon-l'Archambault.

For legislative elections to the National Assembly, Meaulne-Vitray is part of Allier's 2nd legislative constituency.

Intercommunality 
Since its inception the commune has been a part of the communauté de communes du Pays de Tronçais.

List of delegated communes

List of mayors

Population and society

Demographics

Local culture and heritage

Places and monuments 

 , built in the 17th century, the church has been inscribed as a monument historique since 1985. It is notable for containing the particular sculpted group: Vierge de Pitié from the 16th century, and has itself been a monument historique since 1975.
 , built between the 12th  and 17th centuries, the church consists of a bell tower entirely covered in shingles. It has been listed as a monument historique since 2 June 1976.
 , built in the 17th century, the castle has been listed as a monument historique since 1985.
 , located two kilometres from the town centre. The main body of the building dates back to the 17th century and was later supplemented with two pavilion-roofed wings. At one point the castle belonged to Général , the father of French philosopher and government minister during the Vichy regime Jacques Chevalier. The residence, surrounded by a vast property had been abandoned prior to being restored and maintained by its current owners.
 La GilPat, old 8 acres farm which was built in 1905 and located at the foot of the Château des Alliers.
 Forest of Tronçais.

Notables individuals linked to the commune

See also 
Communes of the Allier department

References 

Communes of Allier
Populated places established in 2017
2017 establishments in France

Communes nouvelles of Allier